The Malabar Special Police (MSP) is a paramilitary unit of the State Police of Kerala, India. This unit also trains new recruits and also helps the local police units to maintain law and order during emergencies. During emergencies, this unit forms the riot police platoons fully equipped with riot gear. This police unit is known for its extraordinarily tough training, and the high quality of its firing and military drills.

History

Formed in 1884, the MSP were initially known as the Malappuram Special Police, having been quartered in Malappuram. Its initial personnel consisted of 80 Constables, 4 Native Head Constables, 4 Sergeants, a Bugler and a European Inspector, who were temporarily drafted into a special force to deal with periodical outbreaks by native Muslims Moplahs. The squad was made permanent in 1897.

In the 1921 Moplah Revolt, Malabar (the present districts of Kannur, Wayanad, Kozhikode, Malappuram, Palakkad and parts of Thrissur) witnessed a wave of popular unrest and other law and order problems. Mr. Hitchcock who was then the District Superintendent of Police, South Malabar realized the imperative need to raise a special force, organized, armed and equipped on the lines of an Indian infantry battalion to deal effectively problems threatening public peace. This suggestion, strongly endorsed by the District Magistrate, was accepted by the Viceroy's Government on 30 September 1921, which then sanctioned a strength of 6 British Officers, 8 Subedars, 16 Jemadars, 60 Havildars and 600 Constables to be formed into 6 companies of Auxiliary Police.

In the following year, members of the force were drafted into Madras Presidency to counter the rebellion in the Rampa area that was being led by Alluri Sitarama Raju. Local forces had been unable to match the guerilla tactics of Raju in the forested areas, for which the Malabar unit were considered to be specialists.
On the eve of the linguistic reorganization of States in 1956, the MSP was divided into two. One half of the 6 companies and half of the Headquarters company fell to the share of Kerala and the other half allotted to Madras.  Presently the MSP is headquartered at Malappuram.

References

External links
http://www.tn.gov.in/police/histone.htm

Law enforcement in Kerala
Kerala Police
1884 establishments in India
Government agencies established in 1884